Johnny Bago is an American comedy television series created by Jeffrey Price, Peter S. Seaman and Robert Zemeckis. The series stars Peter Dobson, Rose Abdoo, Anna Berger, Richard Romanus, Timothy Stack and Michael V. Gazzo. The series aired on CBS from June 25, 1993, to July 30, 1993.

Cast 
Peter Dobson as Johnny Bago 
Rose Abdoo as Beverly Florio
Anna Berger as Ma Tenuti
Richard Romanus as Vinnie 
Timothy Stack as Bob Burrows 
Michael V. Gazzo as Don Roselli
Art LaFleur as Captain Lemsky
Barry Shabaka Henley as Detective Venezia

Episodes

References

External links
 

1990s American comedy television series
1993 American television series debuts
1993 American television series endings
English-language television shows
CBS original programming
Television series by Universal Television
Television shows set in Nevada